"Abort, Retry, Fail?" (or "Abort, Retry, Ignore?") is an error message found in DOS operating systems, which prompts the end-user for a course of action to follow. Although welcomed by some, the message also has been cited as an example of poor usability in computer user interfaces.

Background
In CP/M, attempting to read a floppy disk drive with the door open would hang until a disk was inserted and the disk drive door was closed (very early disk hardware did not send any kind of signal until a disk was spinning, and a timeout to detect the lack of signal required too much code on these tiny systems). Many users of CP/M became accustomed to this as a method of managing multiple disks, by opening the disk drive to stop a program from reading or writing a file until the correct disk could be inserted.

A primary design consideration for PC DOS was that software written for CP/M be portable to DOS without changes. Even the first IBM PC had hardware that told the operating system that the disk drive door was open, but returning an error to software trying to read the disk would break the ability to manage disks this way without such changes. Still, it was desirable to improve the experience, in particular by giving the user a way to get out of the hang without having to find a disk to insert in the drive. The prompt was invented for this reason.

Description
A missing disk (or disk drive door opened) was defined by DOS as a "critical error" and would call the "critical error handler". The default "critical error handler" was part of COMMAND.COM and printed the "Abort, Retry, ..." prompt, then waited for user input. Other problems (in particular, a checksum error while reading data from a disk) were also defined as a "critical error", thus causing the prompt to appear for reasons other than a missing disk or opened disk drive. Users could press a key to indicate what they wanted to happen; available options included:

 Abort (A): Terminate the operation or program, and return to the command prompt. In hindsight, this was not a good idea as the program would not do any cleanup (such as completing writing of other files).
 Retry (R): Attempt the operation again. "Retry" was what the user did if they could fix the problem by inserting a disk and closing the disk drive door. On early hardware, retrying a disk read error would sometimes be successful, but as disk drives improved, this became far less likely.
 Ignore (I): Return success status to the calling program or routine, despite the failure of the operation. This could be used for disk read errors, and DOS would return whatever data was in the read buffer (which might contain some of the correct data). "Ignore" did not appear for open drives or missing disks.
 Fail (F): Starting with MS-DOS/PC DOS 3.3, "Fail" returned an error code to the program, similar to a "file not found" error. The program could then gracefully recover, perhaps asking the user for a different file name. This removed the biggest problem with the prompt (which earlier was known as "Abort, Retry, Ignore?") by providing an option that did not crash the program or repeat the prompt.

A program could install its own "critical error handler" while running, and many of the more sophisticated programs (in particular full screen programs) did so in order to avoid the messages disturbing the display. Some programs faked the missing "Fail" response in DOS 2.0 by jumping back to the calling program, skipping the return stack in DOS. This was a risky hack as it relied on the stack layout and skipped cleanup operations in the operating system.

Usability
The error message has been described as being an example of poor user interface design. For most users, if the message appeared, the only choice was to hit 'R'—which repeated the message—or hit another letter, which caused the program to crash and all work to be lost. The scholar Mireille Hildebrandt described it this way:

MS-DOS 6.22 contained a singular case where the only option was "(R) Retry": when flushing the hard disk write-behind cache could not be completed.  The user may attempt to repeat the write until successful or power off the system.

Modern systems

Hard disks and larger removable media such as Zip drives made the need to manage multiple disks per drive obsolete, and thus made the prompt useless. It was gradually replaced with code that acted like "Fail" immediately. DOS 3.3 COMMAND.COM provided the startup option /F to force the default critical error handler to return "Fail" on all errors. Starting with version 4.0, the alternative command line processors 4DOS and NDOS supported /F and the corresponding CritFail=Yes directive in 4DOS.INI/NDOS.INI as well. The option was also supported by the COMMAND.COM of PTS-DOS 6.51 and S/DOS 1.0, as well as by DR-DOS 7.02 and higher. In OpenDOS 7.01, COMMAND.COM provides a similar feature with /N (described as "do not install a critical error handler") which is still supported in newer versions. Most other operating systems, such as Linux, always act like "Fail" in all cases.

  Windows can still generate a similar prompt, although in a dialog box and with a more comprehensive error message. The choices are similar but renamed: "Cancel" (to the user this is similar to "Abort" but technically it is a "Fail" with a different error code), "Try Again" (instead of "Retry") and "Continue" (instead of "Fail"). This may be supported by the drivers for some removable media when a file is opened with a full volume name or the disk is removed while the file is open. However for mundane actions similar to what triggered the prompt in DOS, such as attempting to read "E:" when there is no disk in the CD drive, Windows produces an immediate "Fail".

In popular culture
Humorous variations of Edgar Allen Poe's The Raven using "Abort, Retry, Ignore?" in place of "nevermore" were written in the 1980s and 1990s and were quite popular, distributed by bulletin board and email. The original and best known version has been credited to Cleveland poet Marcus Bales. 

In 1993, Neil Howe published 13th Gen: Abort, Retry, Ignore, Fail?, a sympathetic book about the culture of Generation X.

In 1996, White Town released an EP entitled >Abort, Retry, Fail?_.

PC Magazine has used the term as the title of its column highlighting humorous computer-related errors.

In the 1999 video game Sid Meier's Alpha Centauri "Abort, Retry, Fail?" was graffiti next to the door of the "Edit Universe project," implied to be a research and development undertaking with an ominous potential.  The phrase is introduced as an audio quote when the player achieves the technological advance of "Nanomatter Editation," and ends with the warning, "...if you see this message, always choose 'Retry'."

See also
 Bad command or file name
 Error message
 PC LOAD LETTER

References

DOS technology
Computer error messages
English phrases